Jacomina Hondius (Latinized version of her Dutch name: Jacomijntje de Hond) (24 June 1558 – 02 January 1628) was a Flemish and Dutch calligrapher notable for being the first female European calligrapher to have signed examples of her work published.

Biography 

Hondius was born in Wakken and grew up in Ghent. Her parents were Petronella van Havertuyn and Olivier de Hondt, a bailiff. In 1584, she moved from Flanders to London with her brother Jodocus, to escape religious difficulties. In 1585 in London she married Petrus Montanus (Pieter van den Berghe) (1560 - 1625), an engraver and cartographer like her brother. Jodocus Hondius, Petrus Montanus, and Hondius' brother-in-law Petrus Kaerius (Pieter van den Keere)(1571-ca. 1646?), himself an engraver, formed the nucleus of what was to become "the well known family of cartographers, Hondius." Jacomina Hondius had five children, all sons, one of whom, Samuel Montanus (1592-1669), himself became an engraver, and two of whom went into book trades. 

Hondius contributed two signed plates to her brother Jodocus Hondius’ anthology of European calligraphy, Theatrum artis scribendi (Amsterdam, 1594), "the first international calligraphic anthology." Her pieces were published under the name "Jacquemyne Hondius" alongside the work of a number of well-established artists such as John de Beauchesne, the author of the first copy-book in English. She does not appear to have published anything further under her own name.

She lived in London from 1584 to 1595, in Vlissingen from 1595 to 1598, in Middelburg, Zeeland from 1598 to 1602 and in Amsterdam from 1602 until her death at age 69 in 1628.

See also
 Theatrum artis scribendi
 List of female calligraphers

References

External links

 Jacomina Hondius, Ecartico
 Website Ecartico

1558 births
1628 deaths
16th-century calligraphers
17th-century calligraphers
Artists from Amsterdam
Artists from Ghent
Calligraphers from the Northern Netherlands
Women calligraphers